The EU Capacity Building Mission in Mali (EUCAP Sahel Mali) was initiated on 15 April 2014 within the European Union Common Security and Defense Policy (CSDP) as a Capacity Building Mission in order to train internal security forces in Mali.

EUCAP Sahel Mali was launched at the invitation of the Malian government and is a key component of the European Union's regional approach and strategy for security and development in the Sahel. Aiming to help the Malian government with the reform of its internal security forces, it provides assistance and strategic advice to the national police, the national gendarmerie and the national guard, with a view to improve their operational efficiency, re-establish their respective hierarchical chains, reinforce the role of judicial and administrative authorities, and facilitate the forces' redeployment to the north of the country.

136 Europeans and 53 Malians are currently contributing to the mission.

Next to EUCAP Sahel Mali, there are currently further peace operations in Mali. These are the EU-training mission EUTM Mali, the UN-peacekeeping mission MINUSMA and African Union Mission MISAHEL.

In addition to cooperating and coordinating closely with MINUSMA, EUCAP Sahel Mali is working alongside civil society as it has a major role in supporting the government's reforms and ensuring the Malian population understands them.

References

External links

Capacity building missions of the European Union
Politics of Mali
Political organisations based in Mali